Guud Caanood is a town in the eastern Sanaag region of Somaliland.

See also

References

inhabited the clan habaryoonis [isaaq=-4565051&fid=5787&c=somalia Godanod]

Populated places in Sanaag